According to the United States Department of Defense, there were five dozen Pakistani detainees in Guantanamo prior to May 15, 2006.
The Guantanamo Bay detention camp was opened on January 11, 2002. In the summer of 2004, following the United States Supreme Court's ruling in Rasul v. Bush, the Department of Defense stopped transferring men and boys to Guantanamo. The Supreme Court determined that the detainees had to be given a chance to challenge their detentions in an impartial tribunal.

On September 6, 2006 United States President George W. Bush announced the transfer of 14 high-value detainees from CIA custody to military custody at Guantanamo, including several additional Pakistanis.

On September 7, 2008 Pakistan's Daily Times quoted Hussain Haqqani, Pakistan Ambassador to the United States, stating that only five Pakistanis remained in captivity in Guantanamo: Ume Amaar Al Balochi, Majid Khan, Abdul Rabbani, Muhammad Ahmed, Ghulam Rabbani and Saifullah.
A sixth man, Qari Muhammad Saeed, was reported to have been released on August 29, 2008.

Pakistanis detainees in Guantanamo

References

Pakistani

Pakistan–United States relations